An election for Lord Speaker, the presiding officer of the House of Lords, was held from 13 to 15 April 2021. The incumbent, Lord Fowler, announced on 25 February that he would resign from the office in late April, about four months before the end of his first term.

Election procedure and timetable
Members of the House of Lords who wished to stand for election were required to have a proposer and a seconder. The alternative vote system was used in the election and all members who had taken the oath in the current parliament by 25 March 2021 and were not on leave of absence, disqualified or suspended from the House were eligible to stand and to vote. The election was held remotely by postal and online voting.

Timetable is as follows:
Friday 19 March (12 noon) – Candidate registration and postal voting registration deadline
Tuesday 23 March – List of candidates published
Thursday 25 March (2 p.m.) – First virtual hustings event
Monday 29 March – Ballot papers sent to members requesting a postal vote
Tuesday 13 April (10 a.m.) – Online voting opened
Tuesday 13 April (10 a.m.) – Second virtual hustings event
Thursday 15 April (5 p.m.) – Online voting closed and deadline for postal votes to be returned
Wednesday 21 April – Results announced and Queen's approval notified
Thursday 29 April – Old Lord Speaker presiding for the last time (prorogation)
Saturday 1 May – New Lord Speaker took office
Tuesday 11 May – New Lord Speaker presiding for the first time (state opening)

Candidates
The following members of the House were registered as candidates:
The Lord Alderdice (Liberal Democrat)
The Baroness Hayter of Kentish Town (Labour)
The Lord McFall of Alcluith (Non-affiliated)

Result

References

2021 elections in the United Kingdom
April 2021 events in the United Kingdom
House of Lords
Lord Speaker elections